The Mommsenstadion is a multi-purpose stadium in the locality of Westend in Berlin, Germany, named after the historian Theodor Mommsen. It is currently used mostly for football and hosts the home matches of Tennis Borussia Berlin and SCC Berlin. The stadium has a capacity of 15,005 people (13,200 standing), although the DFB have set an upper limit of 11,500 supporters for football games.

The stadium opened on 17 August 1930 and replaced the former ground of SCC Berlin that fell prey to the extension of the neighbouring Messe Berlin fairgrounds. It soon adopted its name from a nearby gymnasium. The Mommsenstadion was the site of some football matches during the 1936 Summer Olympics and several ISTAF athletics meetings of the IAAF Golden League. Since 1945 it has also been the home ground of Tennis Borussia Berlin.

During the 2006 FIFA World Cup, the Germany national football team used the Mommsenstadion as their training ground.

Matches at the 1936 Summer Olympics

References

External links 

 Stadium information

Football venues in Berlin
Sports venues in Berlin
Tennis Borussia Berlin
Venues of the 1936 Summer Olympics
Olympic football venues
American football venues in Germany
1930 establishments in Germany
Sports venues completed in 1930